West Byfleet is a village in Surrey which grew up around its relatively minor stop on the London & South Western Railway: the station, originally Byfleet and Woodham, opened in 1887. The first place of worship was dedicated in 1912, the parish of West Byfleet associated with it was established in 1917. The village is bounded to the north by the Basingstoke Canal and to the east by the M25 and the Wey Navigation Canal. Forming part of the contiguous development centred on London and its stockbroker belt just outside the M25 motorway, it is 18 miles from London Heathrow and equidistant between the business parks of Woking and Brooklands. In local government it forms a ward on the same basis as its parish in the Borough of Woking.

History
The history until the establishment of the parish in 1917 is that of Byfleet, which saw most of its current developed land, which was formerly fields in the east and densely wooded heath in the west turned into Victorian and Edwardian smallholdings and large houses in the Victorian and Edwardian periods (1831–1911). The railway station, see transport, opened in 1887, primarily to enable commuting.

The village's first church was dedicated in 1912, the parish of West Byfleet associated with it was established in 1917.

Amenities

The Waitrose food supermarket, built in 1989, lies at the centre of the village. Some 70 shops now trade offering a variety of goods as well as services such as hairdressing, beauty treatments, estate and employment agents. All the joint stock banks are represented.
This retail offering has made it for such services a focal point for other neighbouring settlements of: Pyrford, New Haw, Woodham, Byfleet and Ripley and an alternative to Woking. In the 2010s fashion and style shops have complimented the stores offered (e.g. Carmel Snow and Blush).  An art gallery and vintage gift emporium have also established a West Byfleet focus.

West Byfleet has a large number of restaurants for its size. Three coffee shops, an Italian, London House fine dining, a North Indian, a South Indian, a Chinese restaurant and a Chinese takeaway, a pizza takeaway, a wine bar and a Subway are all contained in the small village centre.  Although there is a small amount of turnover, the number tends to remain the same down the years.

During the 2010s, the 1960s developments which formed much of the centre of the village were ageing, and there was a long period of redevelopment planning by various potential builders. In 2020 much of the village was boarded up in preparation for demolition. This meant the loss of the post office, a chemist and a number of other retailers. The redevelopment is expected to take till 2023, and is expected to create many flats and new retail outlets, plus a village square.

The Basingstoke Canal with its tree-lined path to Woking, the Aldershot Urban Area and Basingstoke passes straight forming the north-west border of the village of West Byfleet. An old lady told there was a story of Ghost seen at Woodham Lock on the Basingstoke Canal.

The town has one main football club, West Byfleet Albion (not to be confused with West Bromwich Albion) who play in the Guildford and Woking Alliance League.

Schools
Most secondary school students attend Fullbrook School, St John the Baptist School or Bishop David Brown School.
Primary level schools are:
West Byfleet Junior School
The Marist School.

Churches

Church of England – St John's the Baptist Church, originally part of the Byfleet parish until West Byfleet was established as a parish in 1917. The church, in its entirety, is the work of the architect W.D. Caroe, including the furnishings. The building was completed in 1912.
Roman Catholic – Our Lady Help of Christians

Soil, topography and elevations
 
The surface undulates gently from the west to the east, where West Byfleet's land is drained in the parish of Byfleet itself by the River Wey.
Soil ranges from sandy acidic soil in the west to more alluvial soil in the east, underlain by a mixture of gravel and clay. Elevations range from 18m Above Ordnance Datum to 33m.

Old Avenue has been designated a Conservation Area due its Arcadian environment of substantial family homes of interesting architecture and still good sized gardens. It Is considered the most desirable location of the Parish as it is within easy walking distance of West Byfleet station and as a no through road, a safe and beautiful place to live.

Birchwood Road and part of Station Road has been designated a Conservation Area. Birchwood Road, built between 1910 and 1920 by Mr Stoop a local landowner, is a mixed development of semi-detached Houses and 3 Blocks of 2 Bedroom flats and at the end of the road is a block of one Bedroom Flats. Between nos 18-18a and 19-19a was a drying ground with washing lines, that has been sold by Woking Brough Council. There was another Drying ground and allotments at the back of houses no 47 -56 no 61-65, from no 1 – 8 Station Road it now totally overgrown. The green between the Station and Birchwood Road was given to the tenants as for their use as a Recreation Space by Mr Stoop. There is another Conservation Area east of the Station in Station Approach.

Notable inhabitants

Sir Sydney Camm, Hawker aircraft designer, see also Brooklands
Sir George Edwards, Vickers aircraft designer, see also Brooklands
 JC Carroll composer (inc. of The Sound of The Suburbs)
 J C Stobart (1878–1933), author lived latterly by West Byfleet Golf Course, but buried at (Old) Byfleet (inc. of The Glory That Was Greece)
 Dame Anna Neagle (1904-1986) one of Britain's leading film stars in the late 1930s and 1940s, specializing in romantic comedies and costume biographies.

Demography and housing

The average level of accommodation in the region composed of detached houses was 28%, the average that was apartments was 22.6%.

The proportion of households who owned their home outright compares to the regional average of 35.1%.  The proportion who owned their home with a loan compares to the regional average of 32.5%.  The remaining % is made up of rented dwellings (plus a negligible % of households living rent-free).

Transport

West Byfleet is an excellent transport hub with convenient commuter train services, approximately 30 minutes to Waterloo, good local bus services and easy access to Junctions 10 and 11 of the M25. It is also within 20 minutes of Heathrow and 40 minutes of Gatwick. 
Roads
Motorways are in reach but do not concentrate the traffic in particular parts of West Byfleet.

Rail
The South West Main Line provides, typically 4 trains per hour to London and other destinations in various directions to the south-west including Woking.  Branch lines off this general SW axis connect to other cardinal compass points of the compass (west and south) in the country at Weybridge and at Clapham Junction stations.  Currently for destinations north of Oxford a change should be made in London for faster connections.

More pictures of the village

References

Bibliography
Gardner, Robert (2006) 'From Bouncing Bombs to Concorde – The Authorised Biography of Aviation Pioneer Sir George Edwards, OM' (Sutton Publishing Ltd, Stroud, Gloucs.)

Stevens, Leonard, R (2001) 'A Village of England – Byfleet’

Wakeford, Iain (2004) 'West Byfleet – A Self-Guided Heritage Walk With Notes and Illustrations on the History of the Village and the Basingstoke Canal' (Iain Wakeford, Old Woking, Surrey).

External links

 Woking Borough Council page on West Byfleet
 West Byfleet Business Association
 Local Plan
 War Memorial Photo

Villages in Surrey